The 1992 Speedway World Pairs Championship was the twenty-third FIM Speedway World Pairs Championship. The final took place in Lonigo, Italy. The championship was won by United States who beat England in Run-Off (both 23 points) and Sweden (22 points).

World final
  Lonigo, Pista Speedway

See also
 1992 Individual Speedway World Championship
 1992 Speedway World Team Cup
 motorcycle speedway
 1992 in sports

References

1992
World Pairs
Speedway